The 1995 Boston University Terriers football team was an American football team that represented Boston University as a member of the Yankee Conference during the 1995 NCAA Division I-AA football season. In their sixth season under head coach Dan Allen, the Terriers compiled a 3–8 record (1–7 against conference opponents), tied for last place in the New England Division of the Yankee Conference, and were outscored by a total of 304 to 250.

Schedule

References

Boston University
Boston University Terriers football seasons
Boston University Terriers football